The Mon–Burmese script (မွန်မြန်မာအက္ခရာ)( ) (also called the Mon script, Old Mon script and Burmese script) is an abugida that derives from the Pallava Grantha script of southern India and later of Southeast Asia. It is the basis of the alphabets used for modern Burmese, Mon, Shan, Rakhine, Jingpho and Karen.

History 
The Old Mon language might have been written in at least two scripts. The Old Mon script of Dvaravati (present-day central Thailand), derived from Grantha (Pallava), has conjecturally been dated to the 6th to 8th centuries AD. The second Old Mon script was used in what is now Lower Burma (Lower Myanmar), and is believed to have been derived from Kadamba or Grantha. According to mainstream colonial period scholarship, the Dvaravati script was the parent of Burma Mon, which in turn was the parent of the Old Burmese script, and the Old Mon script of Haripunjaya (present-day northern Thailand). However, according to a minority view, the Burma Mon script was derived from the Old Burmese script and has no relation to the Dvaravati Mon script, based on the claim that there is a four century gap between the first appearance of the Burma Mon script and the last appearance of the Dvaravati Mon script. According to the then prevailing mainstream scholarship, Mon inscriptions from the Dvaravati period appeared in present-day northern Thailand and Laos. Such a distribution, in tandem with archaeological evidence of Mon presence and inscriptions in lower Burma, suggests a contiguous Mon cultural space in lower Burma and Thailand. In addition, there are specifically Mon features in Burmese that were carried over from the earliest Mon inscriptions. For instance, the vowel letter အ has been used in Mon as a zero-consonant letter to indicate words that begin with a glottal stop. This feature was first attested in Burmese in the 12th century, and after the 15th century, became default practice for writing native words beginning with a glottal stop. In contrast to Burmese, Mon only uses the zero-consonant letter for syllables which cannot be notated by a vowel letter. Although Mon of the Dvaravati inscriptions differ from Mon inscriptions of the early second millennium, orthographical conventions connect it to the Mon of the Dvaravati inscriptions and set it apart from other scripts used in the region. Given that Burmese is first attested during the Pagan era, the continuity of orthographical conventions in Mon inscriptions, and the differences between the Pyu script and the script used to write Mon and Burmese, scholarly consensus attributes the origin of the Burmese script to Mon.

The first attestation of written Burmese is an inscription from 1035 CE, (or 984 CE, according to an 18th century recast inscription). From then on, the Mon–Burmese script further developed in its two forms, while staying common to both languages, and only a few specific symbols differ between the Mon and Burmese variants of the script. The calligraphy of modern Mon script follows that of modern Burmese. Burmese calligraphy originally followed a square format but the cursive format took hold in the 17th century when popular writing led to the wider use of palm leaves and folded paper known as parabaiks. The script has undergone considerable modification to suit the evolving phonology of the Burmese language, but additional letters and diacritics have been added to adapt it to other languages; the Shan and Karen alphabets, for example, require additional tone markers.

The Mon–Burmese script has been borrowed and adapted twice by Tai peoples. Around the 14th century, a model of the Mon–Burmese script from northern Thailand was adapted for religious purposes, to correctly write Pali in full etymological spelling. This resulted in the Tai Tham script, which can also be described as a homogenous group of script variants including the Tham Lao, Tham Lanna, Tham Lü and Tham Khün variants. Around the 15th or 16th centuries, the Mon–Burmese script was borrowed and adapted again to write a Tai language of northern Burma. This adaptation resulted in the Shan alphabet, Tai Le script, Ahom script and Khamti script. This group of scripts has been called the "Lik Tai" scripts or "Lik" scripts, and are used by various Tai peoples in northeastern India, northern Myanmar, southwestern Yunnan, and northwestern Laos. According to the scholar Warthon, evidence suggests that the ancestral Lik-Tai script was borrowed from the Mon–Burmese script in the fifteenth century, most probably in the polity of Mong Mao. However, it is believed that the Ahom people had already adopted their script before migrating to the Brahmaputra Valley in the 13th century. Furthermore, The scholar Daniels describes a Lik Tai script featured on a 1407 Ming dynasty scroll, which shows greater similarity to the Ahom script than to the Lik Tho Ngok (Tai Le) script.

Languages 

The script has been adapted for use in writing several languages of Burma other than Mon and Burmese, most notably in modern times Shan and the S'gaw Karen. Early offshoots include Tai Tham script, Chakma script and the Lik-Tai group of scripts, which includes the Tai Le and Ahom scripts. It is also used for the liturgical languages of Pali and Sanskrit.

Symbols

Mon script 
The 35 consonants of the Mon script in the style of the Hanthawaddy era (1287 to 1539 CE). This hand is called Thai Mon or Thai Raman (tɑːɪ rəmɑːn.

Unicode 
The Mon–Burmese script was added to the Unicode Standard in September, 1999 with the release of version 3.0.  Additional characters were added in subsequent releases.

Until 2005, most Burmese-language websites used an image-based, dynamically-generated method to display Burmese characters, often in GIF or JPEG. At the end of 2005, the Burmese NLP Research Lab announced a Myanmar OpenType font named Myanmar1. This font contains not only Unicode code points and glyphs but also the OpenType Layout (OTL) logic and rules. Their research center is based in Myanmar ICT Park, Yangon. Padauk, which was produced by SIL International, is Unicode-compliant. Initially, it required a Graphite engine, though now OpenType tables for Windows are in the current version of this font. Since the release of the Unicode 5.1 Standard on 4 April 2008, three Unicode 5.1 compliant fonts have been available under public license, including Myanmar3, Padauk and Parabaik.

Many Burmese font makers have created Burmese fonts including Win Innwa, CE Font, Myazedi, Zawgyi, Ponnya, Mandalay. It is important to note that these Burmese fonts are not Unicode compliant, because they use unallocated code points (including those for the Latin script) in the Burmese block to manually deal with shaping—that would normally be done by a complex text layout engine—and they are not yet supported by Microsoft and other major software vendors. However, there are few Burmese language websites that have switched to Unicode rendering, with many websites continuing to use a pseudo-Unicode font called Zawgyi (which uses codepoints allocated for minority languages and does not efficiently render diacritics, such as the size of ya-yit) or the GIF/JPG display method.

Burmese support in Microsoft Windows 8 
Windows 8 includes a Unicode-compliant Burmese font named "Myanmar Text". Windows 8 also includes a Burmese keyboard layout. Due to the popularity of the font in this OS, Microsoft kept its support in Windows 10.

Blocks 

The Unicode block called Myanmar is U+1000–U+109F. It was added to the Unicode Standard in September 1999 with the release of version 3.0:

The Unicode block called Myanmar Extended-A is U+AA60–U+AA7F. It was added to the Unicode Standard in October 2009 with the release of version 5.2:

The Unicode called Myanmar Extended-B is U+A9E0–U+A9FF. It was added to the Unicode Standard in June 2014 with the release of version 7.0:

See also 
Burmese alphabet
Burmese numerals
Mon alphabet
Pyu script
S'gaw Karen alphabet
Tai Tham script

Notes

References

Bibliography 

Brahmic scripts